Sir Thomas Fanshawe (1628–1705) was an English politician.

Life
He was the son of Thomas Fanshawe of Jenkins and his wife, Susan, daughter of Matthias Otten of Putney. In the West of England as a royalist of the First English Civil War with his father, in 1645–6, and arrested in 1659, Fanshawe was knighted in 1660 after the English Restoration. He held the post of Clerk of the Crown in the King's Bench, as his father had done.

Family
Fanshawe married first Margaret, daughter of Sir Edward Heath of Cottesmore, who died in 1674; and secondly Elizabeth, daughter of Thomas Fanshawe, 1st Viscount Fanshawe. Susannah, who married Baptist Noel and was mother of Baptist Noel, 3rd Earl of Gainsborough, was a daughter of the first marriage. On her death in 1714, the house at Jenkins passed to her daughter of the same name, who sold it in 1717 to Sir William Humfreys, 1st Baronet. It was replaced by one in the Queen Anne style.

Notes

1628 births
1705 deaths
English MPs 1685–1687
Cavaliers
Knights Bachelor
Fanshawe family